St Martha is a hillside, largely wooded, small civil parish in the Guildford borough of Surrey towards the narrower part of the west half of the North Downs.   It includes three homes north of St Martha's Hill, a southern knoll of the range of hills but almost all its population is south of this, in much of the village: Chilworth which is divided between it and Shalford parish.  This results in an overlapping of areas where it is wished to consider the village of Chilworth (being hereto-before considered a hamlet).  Chilworth gunpowder works mark the southern border of the entity, and are a well-preserved, publicly accessible area of bourne-side former industry, which helped to provide much of Surrey's contribution toward the gunpowder for many years of the British Empire.

Local government
The chairman of the parish council is David Bunting.

History
Of national importance the quite heavily wooded valley floor where the cut mill race of the Tillingbourne runs, is the former Gunpowder Works, a large Scheduled Ancient Monument, formed of scattered industrial remains.  This was a major production centre particularly in the Stuart period of the technology for the explosive and the explosive itself.

Amenities

The principal amenities are those of Chilworth, half of which is in St Martha's.  The 12th century church restored to its Norman state by Henry Woodyer is on a knoll above this — it remains as since the Middle Ages a spiritual sanctuary.

Geography
The panorama above is viewed from St Martha's Hill over all of the south of the parish and beyond, it has a dense patch of woodland which obscure some of its homes however St Martha's ceases before the background rise, which is that of the start of the Greensand Ridge.  The view and landscape resemble neighbouring Newlands Corner on the Downs.

The north of the parish is more heavily wooded and has three homes on a lane leading from Guildford there, White Lane, reflecting the chalkiness of the road.

Demography and housing
In 2001 it had a population of 667. 

The average level of accommodation in the region composed of detached houses was 28%, the average that was apartments was 22.6%.

The proportion of households in the civil parish who owned their home outright compares to the regional average of 35.1%.  The proportion who owned their home with a loan compares to the regional average of 32.5%.  The remaining % is made up of rented dwellings (plus a negligible % of households living rent-free).

References

Borough of Guildford
Civil parishes in Surrey